The 1972–73  Gonzaga Bulldogs men's basketball team represented Gonzaga University during the 1972–73 NCAA University Division basketball season. Members of the Big Sky Conference, the Bulldogs were led by first-year head coach Adrian Buoncristiani and played their home games on campus at Kennedy Pavilion in Spokane, Washington.

Senior forward Greg Sten led the Big Sky in scoring and was selected to the all-conference team; senior forward Joe Clayton was second team and junior center Stewart Morrill was honorable mention.

Previously an assistant coach at UC Santa Barbara. Buoncristiani succeeded Hank Anderson, who left Gonzaga after 21 years as head coach for a similar position at Montana State in Bozeman, a conference rival.  Less than a week after accepting the job in April, Buoncristiani was involved in a traffic accident in Spokane in which his car was demolished, but "ABC" escaped with only minor injuries.

References

External links
Sports Reference – Gonzaga Bulldogs: 1972–73 basketball season

Gonzaga Bulldogs men's basketball seasons
Gonzaga